New York Feminist Art Institute (NYFAI) was founded in 1979 (to 1990) by women artists, educators and professionals. NYFAI offered workshops and classes, held performances and exhibitions and special events that contributed to the political and cultural import of the women's movement at the time. The women's art school focused on self-development and discovery as well as art. Nancy Azara introduced "visual diaries" to artists to draw and paint images that arose from consciousness-raising classes and their personal lives. In the first half of the 1980s the school was named the Women's Center for Learning and it expanded its artistic and academic programs. Ceres Gallery was opened in 1985 after the school moved to TriBeCa and, like the school, it catered to women artists. NYFAI participated in protests to increase women's art shown at the Museum of Modern Art, The Whitney Museum of American Art and other museums. It held exhibitions and workshops and provided rental and studio space for women artists. Unable to secure sufficient funding to continue its operations, NYFAI closed in 1990. Ceres Gallery moved to SoHo and then to Chelsea and remained a gallery for women's art. However, a group continues to meet called (RE)PRESENT, a series of intergenerational dialogues at a NYC gallery to encourage discussion across generations about contemporary issues for women in the arts. It is open to all.

History
New York Feminist Art Institute opened in June 1979 at 325 Spring Street in the Port Authority Building. The founding members and the initial board of directors were Nancy Azara, Miriam Schapiro, Selena Whitefeather, Lucille Lessane, Irene Peslikis and Carol Stronghilos. A board of advisers was established of accomplished artists, educators and professional women. For instance, feminist writer and arts editor at Ms. Magazine Harriet Lyons was an adviser from its start.

Inspired by the actions of the Feminist art movement, the founders sought to create a community that would inspire women artists and help them assess how their art was created in the "social and psychological context of our identity as women."

The Joint Foundation provided a grant that allowed the organization to operate initially. The American Stock Exchange, The Eastman Fund, America the Beautiful Fund, RCA, the Ford Foundation and the NEA also provided grants to the organization. It held biannual open houses and annual benefits to raise funds. One of the earliest was very successful and had Louise Nevelson as a guest of honor. Open house honorees were Alice Neel, Elaine DeKooning, Vivian Browne, Louise Bourgeois, Lenore Tawney, Faith Ringgold, Nancy Spero, Elizabeth Murray and The Guerilla Girls among others.

In April 1981 the organization held a weekend conference "Political Consciousness/ Political Action: Dialogues and Strategies for the 80s" to help women gain a greater sense of personal power and discover ways to engage in the political process. NYFAI also moved to a new location in 1984 in TriBeCa on Franklin Street, which had gallery space for the cooperative Ceres Gallery, additional space for its school and had rental studio and storage space for artists.

In 1984 they co-sponsored a Museum of Modern Art protest, "Women Artists Visibility Event" with the Women's Interart Center, the Heresies Collective, and the Women's Caucus for Art's New York chapter. They protested the few numbers of women in MoMA's grand-reopening and "An International Survey of Recent Painting and Sculpture" exhibition; Of 165 exhibitors, only 14 of them were women. Buttons with the statement, "The Museum of Modern Art Opens but Not to Women," were worn by 400 protesters.

The Institute, which had struggled with ensuring it had sufficient funding for some time, shut down its operations by 1991. Rutgers University Libraries received its library and archives. The non-profit Ceres Gallery moved in 1992 to SoHo and then Chelsea at 547 West 27th Street.

Women's Center for Learning/ New York Feminist Art Institute
The Art Institute focused on self-discovery and art education. First years students participated in consciousness-raising classes developed by Nancy Azara where students created "visual diaries" by recording their feelings and thoughts by writing, painting or writing words into art journals. It taught the history of anthropology and art and feminist theory. Art studies included drawing, sculpture, and painting. It was a program that required inspiration and self-motivation, students did not have grades. Performance was measured by teachers assessments and student self-assessments. Students were offered the opportunity to work as apprentices with professional artists. Part-time students attended weekend workshops and evening courses.

The school added the title the "Women's Center for Learning" in the early 1980s. Focused on personal development, it added writing and psychology classes. Its art program was expanded to include basketry, puppetry, printmaking, papermaking, poetry, filmmaking and much more.

Harmony Hammond, Louise Fishman, Arlene Raven, Barbara Hammer, Elke Solomon, Sarah Draney and Zarina Hashmi were instructors and Leila Daw, Faith Ringgold, May Stevens and Darla Bjork taught weekend workshops at the school.

The school closed in 1990.

Ceres Gallery
Ceres Gallery is a feminist, not-for-profit, alternative gallery in New York City, dedicated to the promotion of contemporary women in the arts. Ceres provides an exhibition space that enhances public awareness and helps remediate women’s limited access to commercial galleries. It also serves as a supportive base for a diversity of artistic and political views. Over the years Ceres has encouraged not only artists but writers, musicians, dancers, poets and storytellers to perform in the gallery and take risks with their work that might not be possible in a commercial setting. The members of Ceres Gallery believe the arts provide an important social service - that art has the power to educate, enhance and enrich the quality and depth of people’s lives.
 
Ceres provides a showcase for women artists regardless of age, artistic style or commercial viability to exhibit their work in New York City, many for the first time. All work meets professional standards of excellence but is not restricted in style, medium or theme. Through its progressive programing, the Gallery has become a gathering place for educational and community activities and in addition to providing the general public with a place to expand their knowledge of contemporary art is also a place for women artists to gather for support and friendship. Many artistic and political events are presented throughout the year with participation by gallery artists, artists not affiliated with the gallery and others from the larger arts community. The gallery operates as a cooperative which means members vote on all decisions including the review of possible new members and they participate in monthly meetings to plan the overall direction of the gallery. In addition, Ceres has a professional Director to facilitate the smooth running of all programs and exhibitions. Currently, Ceres has a roster of showing artists from the New York metropolitan area and from across the country with a small number from countries outside the U.S.

Ceres Gallery was founded in 1984 by Rhonda Schaller, Polly Lai and Darla Bjork, in conversation with NYFAI director, artist Nancy Azara as a program of the New York Feminist Art Institute (NYFAI, 1979-1990). Early members included: Carol Goebel, Phyllis Rosser, Joan Arbeiter, Sandra Branch and Vivian Tsao. The gallery was first located at 91 Franklin Street in Tribeca on the ground floor of the building which housed the New York Feminist Art Institute (NYFAI). Large salon style shows, joint exhibitions and others were held yearly such as: “Reflections: Women in Their Own Image” and “Heroic Female: Images of Power.” In 1993 it moved to 584 Broadway in SoHo where it remained until 2003. Today, Ceres Gallery has 2000+ square feet in one of Chelsea’s premier art destination buildings, The Landmark Arts Building, 547 West 27th Street. Members still at Ceres include Carol Goebel, Phyllis Rosser and Vivian Tsao.

Exhibitions
 1981 - "Transformations," New York Coliseum NYFAI curators: Judith Chiti, Catherine Allen and Linda Hill.
 1985 - "Reflection: Women in Their Own Image"
 1986 - "The Heroic Female: Images of Power"
 1987 - "The Political is Personal"
 1988 - "Work of the Spirit"
 1989 - "Beyond Survival: Old Frontiers, New Visions"
 1990 - "Memory/Reality"

References

External links
 Official site
 1979 WNYC interview with Nancy Azara and Carol Stronghilos at the WNYC Archives

Feminist art organizations in the United States
Women's occupational organizations
Arts organizations based in New York City
Arts organizations established in 1979
Arts organizations disestablished in the 20th century
1979 establishments in New York City
1990 disestablishments in New York (state)
Non-profit organizations based in New York City
History of women in New York City
Feminism in New York City